The Garrison Institute is a non-profit, non-sectarian organization located in Garrison, New York, that is committed to harnessing the power of contemplative wisdom and practice—from many traditions, and in many different contexts—to build a more compassionate and resilient future for all.  Working collaboratively with practitioners in diverse fields, the Institute develops and hosts retreats and symposia, produces research and publications, and provides a hub for ongoing learning networks.

History 
Supporting the call of local conservationists, the Institute's founders rescued what was then a run-down Capuchin monastery from destruction to make way for a proposed large-scale real estate development.

The site was formerly known as Glenclyffe, when it was the 19th century estate of New York Governor and U.S. Secretary of State Hamilton Fish, and it has changed little since it was solely inhabited by the Wappinger Nation of Native Americans.

In 2001, the property was acquired by the Open Space Institute, which generously donated it to the newly formed not-for-profit,  The Garrison Institute, which renovated the building, and opened its doors to the world in 2003.

The Garrison Institute's current building is a renovated version of the 77,000 square foot stone and brick monastery and seminary built by the Capuchin Franciscan Province of St. Mary in 1923. Much of the architectural restoration is notable for what wasn't changed. They tried to keep the essential character of the building—the light and the acoustics—the same.

To consecrate the revival of the building and grounds, extraordinary people were invited to bear witness. The Institute celebrated an auspicious beginning with newly appointed spiritual advisors—Gelek Rimpoche, Rabbi Zalman Schachter-Shalomi and Father Thomas Keating. The opening ceremonies included music by Pete Seeger, Philip Glass and Christine McCall. The Dalai Lama visited the Institute in the fall of 2003 and blessed it, saying that its work was to serve all people and to connect the insights of wisdom traditions with the challenges of
civil society and the environment.

Since 2003, over 60,000 people have participated in the Garrison Institute's retreats and programs.

At the heart of the Garrison Institute's work are our Signature Programs that focus on the practical application of contemplative methods for solving problems in education, the environment, and trauma experienced by those in the helping professions.

In 2004, the Institute began the conversation on mindfulness in education by launching the Initiative on Contemplation and Education (ICE), later renamed the Contemplative Teaching and Learning Initiative and now named CARE for Teachers.

Later in 2004, the Hudson River Project was launched in an effort to bring social science and the humanities to the table in discussions about environmental issues. The Hudson River Project became the Initiative on Transformation Ecology (ITE), now Climate, Mind and Behavior (CMB).

2005 marked the beginning of the Women's Wellness Project, a five-year pilot program conducting contemplative-based trainings for women working to end domestic violence. This was the basis of what became the Initiative on Transforming Trauma (ITT), which is now the Institute's Signature Program on Contemplative-Based Resilience (CBR).

Garrison, New York 
The Garrison Institute is located an hour north of Manhattan, on the east bank of the Hudson River in the Hudson Highlands, across from West Point.

What the Garrison Institute Works On 
The Garrison Institute provides a place of refuge, reflection, and restoration for thousands of people from all walks of life. Informed by the values of simplicity, hospitality and universal welcome, they provide a home for a diverse array of spiritual teachers, students, organizations, and communities of practice from around the country and the world.

The Institute brings together an unusual mix of constituents: contemplative and spiritual teachers, highly credentialed academic scientists, and those working on new forms of social and environmental engagement. Together, they seek to better understand the mind and the many systems it inhabits, and to develop new pathways, rooted in a mix of both spiritual and secular understanding, that lead to deep and lasting social transformation.

Holding this hybrid perspective, they work to incubate new fields, networks, and programs that alleviate suffering, foster greater contemplation and compassion, and encourage the spiritual reinvigoration of society.

The Institute's programs and events explore how contemplative practice and wisdom can enrich our understanding and engagement with various connected dimensions of our changing world. These range from spiritual care to social justice, and from reframing humanity's relationship with the natural world to rethinking our relationship with technology.

Staff and teachers 
The Garrison Institute is led by executive director Johnathan Weisner.  Teachers and presenters at the Garrison Institute have included Adyashanti, the Dalai Lama, Rajmohan Gandhi, Philip Glass, Daniel Goleman, Mikhail Gorbachev, Paul Hawken, Father Thomas Keating, Sharon Salzberg, Pete Seeger, Roshi Enkyo O’Hara, Peter Senge, Lama Surya Das, Tsoknyi Rinpoche, Yongey Mingyur Rinpoche, and many others.

Board of Trustees 
 Rachel Gutter, Co-Chair
 Jonathan F. P. Rose, Co-Chair
 Monica Winsor
 Lisette Cooper
 Will Rogers, Treasurer
 Ruth Cummings
 Paul Hawken
 Diana Calthorpe Rose
 Sharon Salzberg
 Daniel J. Siegel
 Susan Davis

External links 
 Official website

References

Education in Putnam County, New York
Non-profit organizations based in New York (state)
501(c)(3) organizations